Jason Fram (born April 23, 1995), also known as Liu Jie, is a professional ice hockey defenceman.

Playing career
Born in Canada, he currently plays for the Kunlun Red Star of the Kontinental Hockey League (KHL). Fram was called up to represent the China men's national ice hockey team for the 2022 Winter Olympics.

Career statistics

Regular season and playoffs

International

References

External links

1995 births
Living people
Allen Americans players
Canadian emigrants to China
Canadian ice hockey defencemen
Canadian people of Chinese descent
Chinese ice hockey defencemen
Chinese people of Canadian descent
Ice hockey players at the 2022 Winter Olympics
KRS-BSU players
HC Kunlun Red Star players
Naturalized citizens of the People's Republic of China
Olympic ice hockey players of China
San Jose Barracuda players
Spokane Chiefs players
Ice hockey people from Vancouver
Canadian expatriate ice hockey players in the United States